Kontalaksky Golets is a peak in the Yablonoi Mountains. Administratively it is part of the Transbaikal Krai, Russian Federation.

Geography
It is located in the far northeastern section of the range, just a little north of Tungokochen. 

The Kontalaksky Golets is a ‘’golets’’-type of mountain with a bald peak. It rises to the west of the valley of the Karenga in a largely remote and uninhabited part of Transbaikalia. There are pillar-like rock formations in this mountain similar to the kigilyakhs of Yakutia.

See also
List of mountains in Russia
List of rock formations§Russia

References

External links
природа — LiveJournal (Picture of rock formations)

Mountains of Zabaykalsky Krai
ceb:Gora Kontalakskiy Golets